Grimbergen may refer to:

Places
 Grimbergen, Flemish Brabant, Belgium
 Grimbergen Abbey, Premonstratensian monastery
 Grimbergen Airfield

People
 Maarten van Grimbergen (born 1959), Dutch hockey player
 Petra Grimbergen (born 1970), Dutch cyclist

Other
 Grimbergen (beer), Belgian beer